The Iglesia del Carmen (Church of Virgin of the Carmelites) is Gothic and Baroque-style, Roman Catholic church located in Requena, province of Valencia, Spain.

The church was originally attached to a 13th-century Convent of the Carmelite Nuns. The walls are decorated in azulejo tiles. The Façade is neoclassic but maintains a later portal. It contains a decorated Chapel of the Virgen de la Soterrraña (Subterranean Virgin).

See also
Catholic Church in Spain

References

13th-century Roman Catholic church buildings in Spain
Baroque architecture in the Valencian Community
Gothic architecture in the Valencian Community